Erwin Wilhelm Maria Lichnofsky (6 August 1903 – 25 February 1974), sometimes referred to as Johann Lichnovsky or Johann Lichnowski, was a Czech ice hockey player. He competed for Czechoslovakia in the men's tournament at the 1928 Winter Olympics.

References

External links

 
 
 
 

1903 births
1974 deaths
Czech ice hockey forwards
Olympic ice hockey players of Czechoslovakia
Ice hockey players at the 1928 Winter Olympics
Sportspeople from Opava
Czechoslovak ice hockey forwards
Czechoslovak people of German descent
German military personnel of World War II
Czechoslovak emigrants to West Germany
Silesian-German people